Alun Wyn Evans (b 1947) is a Welsh Anglican priest.

Evans was educated at Downing College, Cambridge and Ripon College Cuddesdon. He was ordained deacon in 1972, and priest in 1973. After curacies at Bargoed and Coity  he held incumbencies in Cwmafan, Llangynwyd, Cardiff and Swansea. .He was the Archdeacon of Carmarthen from 2004 to 2012.

References

 

1947 births
Living people
Alumni of Downing College, Cambridge
Archdeacons of Carmarthen
Alumni of Ripon College Cuddesdon
20th-century Welsh Anglican priests
21st-century Welsh Anglican priests